Justine Indira Skyers (born August 24, 1995), known professionally as Justine Skye, is an American singer, songwriter, and model. Her initial fame from Tumblr found a career in the music industry and signed with Atlantic Records at the age of 19.

Early life 
Justine Indira Skyers was born on August 24, 1995, in the Fort Greene neighborhood of Brooklyn, New York City, to Jamaican parents. Her mother, Nova Perry, an entertainment lawyer, is of Afro-Jamaican and Indo-Jamaican descent, and her father, Christopher Skyers, a corporate merchandiser VP, is also Afro-Jamaican. Her grandfather is politician N. Nick Perry, the United States ambassador to Jamaica.

Career 
Skye began her professional singing career when she performed songs to go with the book Rules to Rock By. She is known for having made a cover of Drake's song "Headlines", receiving over two million views on YouTube. In 2012, Skye released her very first mixtape, Skye High. Following the success of Skye High, her debut seven-track EP, Everyday Living, helped her land a deal with Atlantic Records in 2013. Her song "Hard Work" landed on BET's 106 & Park Top 10. She released the album Emotionally Unavailable in 2015. Not long after, her song "Collide" (featuring Tyga) was released.

In October 2015, she performed at Tidal 10x20, an event created by Jay-Z, and at a Tommy Hilfiger show in Brazil. Skye has not been limited to music and made an appearance as a guest star on the final episode of House of DVF.

In 2016, she left Atlantic Records and signed to Roc Nation and Republic Records. In December 2016, Skye released her EP 8 Ounces, to positive reviews.

Her debut album Ultraviolet was released on January 18, 2018. The album featured the singles "U Don't Know" (featuring Wizkid), "Back for More" (featuring Jeremih), and "Don't Think About It". The music video for "Don't Think About It" was released on December 8, the same day as the pre-order, and the song "Good Love" became available with the album pre-order. The album peaked at number 16 on the R&B Album Sales chart.

In June 2021, her third studio album, Space & Time, was released. The album was executively produced by Timbaland.

Personal life 
On November 19, 2018, Skye did an interview with The Breakfast Club, in which she spoke about experiencing domestic violence. On February 12, 2019, Skye identified rapper Sheck Wes as the abuser on Twitter, and shared a video of him climbing a fence at her house. He denies the allegations.

In 2019, Skye dated rapper GoldLink.

Discography

Studio albums

Compilation albums

Extended plays

Singles

As a featured artist

Filmography

Film

Television

References

External links 
Official website

 "Meet Justine Skye, The 19-Year-Old That Leveraged Tumblr Fame Into A Music Career", by Deidre Dyer, The Fader, 2015-01-30.
 "JUSTINE TIME: MEET RISING R&B STAR JUSTINE SKYE" Paper 2015-07
 "My Essence Fest: Justine Skye on Why She's a Purple Unicorn", InStyle, July 5, 2015, by Emil Wilbekin

1995 births
Living people
21st-century African-American women singers
American musicians of Jamaican descent
People from Fort Greene, Brooklyn
American contemporary R&B singers